The Pegasus Prize for Literature is a literary prize established by Mobil (now ExxonMobil) in 1977 to honor works from countries whose literature is rarely translated into English. The prize includes a monetary award, a medal depicting Pegasus, and translation into English and subsequent publication of the work by Louisiana State University Press.

The country is first recommended by a committee and then an independent selection committee in the chosen nation determines the winner. Representatives to the country selection committee have included Mona Simpson, Alan Cheuse, and William Jay Smith.

Winners of the Pegasus Prize
 1979 - Kirsten Thorup for Baby
 1980 - Tidiane Dem for Masseni
 1983 - Cees Nooteboom for Rituals
 1985 - Keri Hulme for The Bone People
 1986 - Ismail Marahimin for And the War is Over
 1989 - Kjartan Fløgstad for Dollar Road
 1991 - Jia Pingwa for Turbulence
 1993 - Martin Simecka for The Year of the Frog
 1994 - Bilge Karasu for Night
 1995 - Francisco Rebolledo for Rasero
 1996 - Mario de Carvalho for A God Strolling in the Cool of the Evening
 1998 - Ana Teresa Torres for Doña Inés vs. Oblivion

References

External links
 Exxon Mobil Pegasus Prize

American literary awards